Joseph Barker (October 19, 1751 – July 5, 1815) was an American Congregationalist minister who represented Massachusetts's 7th congressional district in the United States House of Representatives from March 1805 to March 1809.

Born in Branford in the Connecticut Colony, Barker attended the common schools in Branford, studied for two years at Harvard College, and was graduated (with a degree in theology) from Yale College in 1771. He was licensed to preach on January 3, 1775, ordained to the ministry on December 5, 1781, and subsequently installed as pastor of the First Congregational Church of Middleboro, Massachusetts.

Barker was elected as a Democratic-Republican to the Ninth and Tenth Congresses and served from March 4, 1805 to March 3, 1809. He was not a candidate for renomination in 1808, but four years later served as a member of the state's House of Representatives in 1812 and 1813.

Joseph Barker continued in the ministry at Middleboro, Massachusetts until his death at the age of 63. Interment was in Cemetery at The Green.

References

18th-century Congregationalist ministers
19th-century Congregationalist ministers
American Congregationalist ministers
Members of the Massachusetts House of Representatives
People from Branford, Connecticut
People from Middleborough, Massachusetts
Yale Divinity School alumni
1751 births
1815 deaths
Democratic-Republican Party members of the United States House of Representatives from Massachusetts
Harvard College alumni
Yale College alumni
19th-century American clergy
18th-century American clergy